Sherbrooke is a federal electoral district in Quebec, Canada, that has been represented in the House of Commons of Canada since 1925.

Geography

This riding in the south of the province is located in the Quebec region of Estrie. It consists of most of the city of Sherbrooke, other than certain areas to the north and south.

The riding is enclosed in its only neighbour, Compton—Stanstead.

History
It was created in 1924 from parts of Town of Sherbrooke and Richmond—Arthabaska ridings.

The 2012 electoral redistribution saw this riding gain and lose territory with Compton—Stanstead.

Members of Parliament

This riding has elected the following members of the House of Commons of Canada:

Election results

Source: Elections Canada

Note: Conservative vote is compared to the total of the Canadian Alliance vote and Progressive Conservative vote in 2000 election.

Note: Social Credit vote is compared to Ralliement créditiste vote in the 1968 election.

Note: Ralliement créditiste vote is compared to Social Credit vote in the 1963 election.

Note: Progressive Conservative vote is compared to "National Government" vote in 1940

Note: "National Government" vote is compared to Conservative vote in 1935 election.

See also
 List of Canadian federal electoral districts
 Past Canadian electoral districts

References

 Campaign expense data from Elections Canada
Riding history from the Library of Parliament

Notes

Quebec federal electoral districts
Politics of Sherbrooke